Busachi (official name in Sardinian language: Busache)  is a comune (municipality) in the Province of Oristano in the Italian region Sardinia, located about  north of Cagliari and about  northeast of Oristano.

Busachi borders the following municipalities: Allai, Fordongianus, Ghilarza, Neoneli, Samugheo, Ula Tirso.

References

Cities and towns in Sardinia